De’Shaan Duane Dixon (born December 16, 1998) is an American football outside linebacker for the Jacksonville Jaguars of the National Football League (NFL). He played college football at Norfolk State.

Early years
Dixon attended Western Branch High School in Chesapeake, Virginia. He only received two offers to play college football coming out of high school. He verbally committed to Norfolk State over Virginia State on January 26, 2017.

College career
He played at Norfolk State from 2017 to 2021. During his career he had 154 tackles (69 solo), 24.5 tackles for loss, and 14.5 sacks in 42 games. He also had one forced fumble, two fumble recoveries, and 10 pass break ups. After his senior season in 2021, he entered the 2022 NFL Draft.

Professional career

On May 2, 2022, Dixon signed with the Jacksonville Jaguars as an undrafted free agent following the 2022 NFL Draft. On August 30, 2022, after the final roster cutdown of the preseason, Dixon made the 53-man roster for the 2022 season.

References

External links
Jacksonville Jaguars bio
Norfolk State Spartans bio

Living people
1998 births
Sportspeople from Chesapeake, Virginia
Players of American football from Virginia
American football defensive ends
American football outside linebackers
Norfolk State Spartans football players
Jacksonville Jaguars players